Hacıibrahimuşağı  is a village situated in the Ortaköy District, Aksaray Province, Turkey. Its population is 280 (2021).

References

Villages in Ortaköy District, Aksaray